Alois Hyčka (born 22 July 1990 in Cheb) is a Czech football player who currently plays for FK Teplice.

References
 Profile at FC Zbrojovka Brno official site
 

1990 births
Living people
Czech footballers
People from Cheb
Association football defenders
Czech First League players
FK Hvězda Cheb players
SK Slavia Prague players
FK Ústí nad Labem players
FC Zbrojovka Brno players
FK Teplice players
Sportspeople from the Karlovy Vary Region